was an independent video game developer based in Tokyo, Japan. The company, which employed just under 300 individuals before its closure, was founded on July 1, 2003 by Yoshiki Okamoto after he departed from Japanese game developer and publisher Capcom. He began working at rival game developer and publisher Konami in the 1980s, and was responsible for such arcade games as Gyruss and Time Pilot. He then moved to Capcom, where he worked on many franchises, such as 1942, Resident Evil and especially Street Fighter II.

While Game Republic was a completely independent developer able to produce titles for any publisher and/or platform they desire, during the company's early years it had enjoyed a close relationship with Sony, with many of their early titles funded by and produced in conjunction with the publisher. In June 2011 reports surfaced of Game Republic shutting down its website and vacating its offices. Many of the former Game Republic developers have been hired by Tango Gameworks.

Games

References

External links

 
Defunct video game companies of Japan
Video game development companies
Software companies based in Tokyo
Japanese companies established in 2003
Japanese companies disestablished in 2011
Video game companies established in 2003
Video game companies disestablished in 2011
Privately held companies of Japan